The Rezovo (also Rezovska, Rezvaya and Rezve;) is a river in the extreme southeast of Bulgaria and northernmost part of European Turkey. The river is situated in Bulgaria's Strandzha Nature Park.

River basin
The Rezovo is 112 km long and its source is in the Turkish part of the Strandzha mountains east of Kofçaz in Turkey under the Turkish name of Paspalderesi. It generally flows east from Turkey to Bulgaria, and after Paspala village of Kırklareli Province in Turkey becomes a border river between the Turkey and Bulgaria until its mouth in the Black Sea at Rezovo. This location constitutes the southernmost point of the Bulgarian Black Sea Coast and the northernmost point of the Turkish one, as well as the southeasternmost point of Bulgaria and northeasternmost point of Turkish Thrace. The Rezovo's catchment spreads over 739 km2, of which 555 km2 are in Turkey, and 184 km2 in Bulgaria. Its largest tributary is the Velika.

Bulgaria-Turkey riverine border

The border at the Rezovo's mouth was the subject of a minor territorial dispute between Bulgaria and Turkey, which was settled in the 1990s. As a result of an agreement between the two countries of 6 May 1992 (ratified by Bulgaria in 1998), Bulgaria received a small land area of several square kilometres in the Rezovo Bay in return for water area in the continental shelf.

References and notes

Rivers of Bulgaria
Rivers of Turkey
Landforms of Burgas Province
Strandzha
International rivers of Europe
Territorial disputes of Turkey
Territorial disputes of Bulgaria
Bulgaria–Turkey border
Landforms of Kırklareli Province
Tributaries of the Black Sea
Border rivers